Sloanea caribaea, commonly known as acomat boucan, is a tree of the eastern Caribbean region.

References

Sloanea caribaea at Oxford University's Virtual Field Herbarium.

caribaea
Trees of the Caribbean
Flora without expected TNC conservation status